Weberocereus rosei is a species of cactus from Ecuador.

References

Night-blooming plants
rosei